Annabella of Scotland ( – 1509), was a Scottish princess, a member of the House of Stewart and by her two marriages Countess of Geneva and Countess of Huntly. Both of her marriages were annulled, the first without being consummated and the second on grounds of consanguinity.

Life

Early years
Presumably named after her paternal grandmother, Annabella was the eighth child and sixth daughter of King James I and Joan Beaufort. Her sisters were Margaret, Isabella, Eleanor, Mary and Joan, and her brothers were James II of Scotland and his twin brother Alexander, who died in infancy.

First marriage
On 14 December 1444 was signed the marriage contract between Annabella and Louis, Count of Geneva, son of Louis, Duke of Savoy at Stirling Castle. Both bride and groom were about 8-years-old. The following year, Annabella went to Savoy to be educated there.

The cortege of the princess, accompanied by the ambassadors of her father-in-law, arrived in Savoy in September 1445, after an eventful journey of 86 days. Many expenses were incurred for her reception, despite the fact that she was neither the heiress to the Kingdom of Scotland, nor the future Duchess of Savoy.

However, the official wedding was never celebrated. King Charles VII of France, wasn't in favor of this alliance and sent several embassies to prevent it. The marriage contract was thus broken during negotiations at Gannat in 1458, in the presence of the French King and the representatives of the Duke of Savoy and the King of Scotland. The Duke had to pay 25,000 écus in damages to the Scottish royal family.

Second marriage
Annabella returned to Scotland and married Lord George Gordon, son and heir of the 1st Earl of Huntly before 10 March 1460. After the death of her father-in-law on 15 July 1470, her husband became in the 2nd Earl, and Annabella the Countess of Huntly. However, shortly after the 2nd Earl instituted proceedings to have his marriage with Annabella annulled on the grounds that she was related in the third and fourth degrees of consanguinity with his first wife, Elizabeth Dunbar, 8th Countess of Murray; the marriage was finally dissolved by sentence pronounced on 24 July 1471.

Issue
Annabella had children with her second husband the 2nd Earl of Huntly; two children are definitely attributed to her:
 Lady Isabella Gordon (d. 1485), wife of William Hay, 3rd Earl of Erroll (d. 1507).
 Alexander Gordon, 3rd Earl of Huntly (died 21 January 1523/24).

However, there are other children of the 2nd Earl of Huntly whose maternity remained disputed; they could be children of either Annabella or the 2nd Earl's third and last wife (and previously mistress) Lady Elizabeth Hay:

 Adam Gordon, who married Lady Elizabeth de Moravia, daughter and heir of John de Moravia, 8th Earl of Sutherland, and in her right became Countess of Sutherland after her brother's death. Their son was Alexander Gordon, Master of Sutherland.
 William Gordon, who married Janet Ogilvy and was the ancestor of the Gordons of Gight.
 James Gordon, mentioned in an entail in 1498.
 Lady Janet Gordon, who married firstly, Alexander Lindsay, Master of Crawfurd; secondly, Patrick, Master of Gray (annulled); thirdly, Patrick Buttar of Gormark; and fourthly, James Halkerston of Southwood. She died before February 1559.
 Lady Elizabeth Gordon, who was contracted to marry William Keith, 3rd Earl Marischal, in 1481.

Ancestry

Notes

References

Bibliography

 Priscilla Bawcutt, Bridget Henisch, Scots Abroad in the Fifteenth Century: The Princesses Margaret, Isabella and Eleanor, Elizabeth Ewan and Maureen M. Meikle (éd.), Women in Scotland, c.1100-1750, East Linton, Tuckwell, 1999, pp. 45–55. online
 
 Fiona Downie, La Voie Quelle Menace Tenir': Annabella Stewart, Scotland, and the European Marriage Market, 1444-56, The Scottish Historical Review, vol. 78, no. 206, 1999, pp. 170–191. .
 Eva Pibiri, Histoire de femme, histoire d’Etat. Stratégie matrimoniale à la cour de Savoie pour la couronne de Chypre, 1455-1457 (in French), in Bollettino storico-bibliografico subalpino, 102/2 (2004), pp. 443–472. online
 Meredith Comba, Methods of queenship in matrimonial diplomacy: Fifteenth century Scottish royal women . Constellations, 2014, vol. 5, no 2.

1430s births
1509 deaths
Scottish princesses
Huntly
House of Stuart
Princesses of Savoy
15th-century Scottish women
16th-century Scottish women
15th-century Scottish people
16th-century Scottish people
Daughters of kings